Google Inc v Equustek Solutions Inc was a 2017 decision of the Supreme Court of Canada dealing with the authority to issue injunctions against foreign companies.

Aftermath
On November 2, 2017, a California district court granted an injunction against the enforcement of the order of the Supreme Court of Canada on the grounds that the order undermines the US law and threatens freedom of speech.

However, The Court of British Columbia dismissed Google's application (2018 BCSC 610) to respect the US judgment saying 
The effect of the U.S. order is that no action can be taken against Google to enforce the injunction in U.S. courts. That does not restrict the ability of this Court to protect the integrity of its own process through orders directed to parties over whom it has personal jurisdiction.

See also
 List of Supreme Court of Canada cases (McLachlin Court)

References

External links
 2017 SCC 34

Supreme Court of Canada cases
2017 in Canadian case law